Gudauta District is a district of Abkhazia, Georgia’s breakaway republic. It corresponds to the eponymous Georgian district. Its capital is Gudauta, the town by the same name. The population of the district was 34,869 at the time of the 2003 census, down from 57,334 in 1989. By the time of the 2011 Census, the population had increased to 36,775.

Administration
Lev Shamba was reappointed as Administration Head on 10 May 2001 following the March 2001 local elections.

On 16 June 2003, President Ardzinba assented to Shamba's request for dismissal and replaced him with First Deputy Minister for Education Beslan Dbar.

On 29 March 2005, newly elected President Sergei Bagapsh replaced Beslan Dbar as the Head of Gudauta's Administration by Daur Vozba. During the February 2011 assembly elections, Daur Vozba failed to be re-elected by a margin of 92 votes. Sergei Bagapsh appointed Valeri Malia as his successor on 23 February. On 17 February, during its first session, the new Gudauta District assembly elected Roman Bazba its chairman, with 22 out of 29 votes, and Fyodor Sakania its Deputy Chairman.

On 1 November 2011, Abkhazia's Prosecutor General announced that he had initiated criminal proceedings against former Administration Head Daur Vozba, for abuse of power. Vozba is alleged to have signed a decree on 11 August 2006, handing over two most valuable plots of coastal land to two individuals, which would have required authorisation by the Cabinet of Ministers.

Following the May 2014 Revolution and the election of Raul Khajimba as President, on 23 September 2014 he replaced Malia as Administration Head with Ruslan Ladaria.

List of Administration Heads

Demographics
At the time of the 2011 Census, Gudauta District had a population of 36,775:

Abkhaz (81.9%)
Armenians (10.0%)
Russians (5.0%)
Georgians (1.4%)
Ukrainians (0.4%)
Greeks (0.3%)

Settlements
The district's main settlements are:
Gudauta
New Athos
Lykhny

Twin regions
On 20 September 2013, Gudauta District signed a Friendship and Partnership Agreement with Kstovsky District.

See also
Administrative divisions of Abkhazia

References

 
Districts of Abkhazia
Districts of Georgia (country)